Omnibus was an American, commercially sponsored, educational variety television series.

History
Omnibus was created by the Ford Foundation, which sought to increase the education level of the American public. The show was conceived by James Webb Young who hired Robert Saudek as producer. Saudek believed that Omnibus could "raise the level of American taste" with educational entertainment.

The show was broadcast live, primarily on Sunday afternoons at 4:00pm EST, from November 9, 1952, until April 16, 1961. Omnibus originally aired on CBS, and later on Sunday evenings on ABC. The show was never commercially viable on its own, and sources of funding dwindled after the Ford Foundation ended its sponsorship in 1957. That year, the program moved to NBC, where it was irregularly scheduled until 1961. The show's first season had an audience of 4 million, which grew to 5.7 million at its peak in 1957. ABC aired a brief revival of the series in 1981.

The series won more than 65 awards, including eight Emmy Awards (it was nominated for thirteen) and two Peabody Awards. The series is held at the Library of Congress and Global ImageWorks, among other archives. The Bernstein Omnibus programs were released in a 4-DVD set for Region 1 and Region 2 in 2010.

Programming
The show, hosted by Alistair Cooke in his American television debut, featured diverse programming about science, the arts, and the humanities. The program featured original works by playwrights such as William Saroyan, interviews with public figures such as architect Frank Lloyd Wright, and performances by many of the most prominent entertainers of the day such as Jack Benny and Orson Welles. A heavily abridged version of Shakespeare's King Lear starring Orson Welles, staged by Peter Brook and directed by Andrew McCullough , was telecast on 18 October 1953 on CBS. Leonard Bernstein and Jonathan Winters made their first television appearances in the series. Bernstein gave his first televised music lectures on the program, and conducted one of the earliest telecasts of excerpts from Handel's Messiah on it. The best remembered episode featuring Bernstein was his first, transmitted on November 14, 1954: an analysis of Beethoven's Fifth Symphony in which the conductor demonstrated what the music might have been like if Beethoven had left some of his discarded music sketches in the symphony.

Hans Conried was featured in the 1958 episode "What Makes Opera Grand?", an analysis by Leonard Bernstein showing the powerful effect of music in opera. Conried played Marcello in a spoken dramatization of act 3 of Puccini's La bohème. The program demonstrated the effect of the music in La bohème by having actors speak portions of the libretto in English, followed by opera singers singing the same lines in the original Italian.

See also
 Omnibus (British TV programme)

References

External links
 
 Omnibus, Encyclopedia of Television, Museum of Broadcast Communications
 
 Omnibus, Global ImageWorks footage library

1952 American television series debuts
1961 American television series endings
1950s American variety television series
1960s American variety television series
American Broadcasting Company original programming
Black-and-white American television shows
CBS original programming
English-language television shows
NBC original programming
Peabody Award-winning television programs
Primetime Emmy Award for Outstanding Variety Series winners
American educational television series